Dorcasta is a genus of beetles in the family Cerambycidae, containing the following species:

 Dorcasta borealis Breuning, 1940
 Dorcasta cinerea (Horn, 1860)
 Dorcasta crassicornis Pascoe, 1858
 Dorcasta dasycera (Erichson in Schomburg, 1848)
 Dorcasta gracilis Fisher, 1932
 Dorcasta implicata Melzer, 1934
 Dorcasta quadrispinosa Breuning, 1940
 Dorcasta singularis Martins & Galileo, 2001

References

 
Cerambycidae genera